Ro is a given name, nickname and surname. This page does not list hyphenate -ro, -Ro, Ro- or ro- names, nor people with the Royal Ro title. Select hyphenated nicknames are in the See also section. Notable people known by this name include the following:

Given name

Ro Ann Maggiolino Destito, full name of RoAnn Destito (born 1956), American politician
Ro Haber (fl. 2013 – present), American transgender writer and director
Ro Hindson (born 1951), Canadian rugby union player
Ro Khanna, nickkname of Rohit Khanna (born 1976), American politician
Rō Takenaka (1930 – 1991), Japanese reporter, anarchist and critic
RO Tambunan, nickkname of Robert Odjahan Tambunan (1935 – 2015), Indonesian lawyer veteran and politician

Middle name
Mary Ro Reyes (born 1992), Mexican figure skater
John Ro Myung, full name of John Myung (born 1967), Korean American musician

Surname

Ro Chol-ok (born 1993), North Korean football defender
Ro Do-chon (born 1936), South Korean cyclist
Eric Ro (fl. 2007 – present), Korean-American producer
Ro Hak-su (born 19 1990), North Korean international football player
Ro Hyon-il (born 1969), North Korean weightlifter
Ro Jai-bong (born 1936), South Korean politician
Ro Jong-suk (fl. 1979), North Korean table tennis player
Ro Song-sil (born 1960), North Korean politician
Ro Tu-chol (born 1950), North Korean politician
YoungSang Ro (born 1954), South Korean theologian

Nickname

Adam Ro (fl. 2015 – present), stagename of Rashid Rauf Adam, Ghanaian entertainer and personality 
Lady of Ro, nickname of Despina Achladiotou (1890 – 1982), Greek patriot
Kara Ro, stagename of Kara Rheault (born 1975), boxing and MMA trainer and boxer
Ro Allen, (formerly Rowena Allen, fl. 2015 – 2021), Australian LGBTIQ advocate
Ro Atherton (fl. 1979 – present), nickname of Rowena Atherton, British military officer
Ro Foege, nickname of Romaine Henry Foege (born 1938), American politician
Ro James, (fl. 2011 – present), stagename of Ronnie James Tucker, American singer and songwriter
Ro Mogendorff, nickname of Rosa Catherina Mogendorff (1907-1969), Dutch artist.
Ro Ransom (fl. 2011 – present), stagename of Noah Gale, American rapper, singer, songwriter, and record producer
Yung Ro, stagename of Roland Sato Lee Page, American hip-hop/rap artist

Fictional characters
Kanjar Ro, DC Comics supervillain
Ro Laren, from Star Trek: The Next Generation 
Rosalie "Ro" Rowan, from The Zeta Project

See also

J-Ro
Z-Ro
Roro (name)